Nazareth Speedway is an auto racing facility near Nazareth in the Lehigh Valley region of Pennsylvania which operated from 1910 to 2004 in two distinct course configurations. In its early years, it was a dirt twin oval layout. In 1987 it was reopened as a paved tri-oval that measured just slightly under 1 mile.

The facility is often linked to local drivers Mario and Michael Andretti's early racing careers. It was also associated with Frankie Schneider due to his large number of wins on the two dirt tracks.

As of November 2015, the site was purchased by Raceway Properties LLC under David Jaindl. There are no current plans to return racing to the facility.

Track history

Nazareth Speedway started as a horse racing track farther up in the center of the town in the 1850s known as the Northampton County Agricultural Fairgrounds. As the crowds grew, the location grew too crowded to remain in the center of the town. Around 1900, a new  mile dirt track was constructed at the current location between Route 191 and 248. The site began hosting motor racing events in the 1910s.

In 1966, an additional 1 mile dirt track was added. In 1987, the Penske-owned paved speedway replaced the big track and the small track was demolished and the site was replaced by the expanding of a nearby grocery store in 1988.

Dirt track (small)
The  mile dirt track was constructed in the 1900s as a horse racing track. The first automotive events held at the location were not racing, instead it was a sport called auto polo. Following the Great Depression the first large race that happened at the small track would be held in 1947 by the American Automobile Association. The race included 35 cars, and attracted a crowd of 11,000 spectators.

In 1952, Jerry Fried purchased the fairgrounds. He continued the racing, and added in additional events, such as demolition derbies. The track was also the location of one of the first enduro races on the east coast. The  mile track continued to operate weekly during the closing of the large track from 1971 to 1982.

In the time period the short track was open, Buzzie Reutimann won 33 races, leading to the 1972 and 1973 track titles.

During Roger Penske's ownership in 1988, the track was sold to nearby Laneco supermarket and demolished.

Dirt track (large)
The big track was opened in April 1966, as a five-turn  dirt track named Nazareth National Speedway. The track featured modified races. Frankie Schneider had a clean sweep at the event - he had the fastest qualifying time, won his heat race, and won the feature event. The event turned out to be the only event at the track in the season.

The track held nine events in 1967, which was the most events the track hosted in one season. Schneider won five of the races.

In 1968, the track hosted five modified events. Schneider won three of them. Al Tasnady started near last in the August 24, 1968 modified event, and won the race by lapping all drivers except Schneider. USAC Dirt Champ cars raced at the track on July 13, 1968. The race was won by Al Unser, who beat local driver Mario Andretti.

Mario Andretti won the USAC dirt champ car race in 1969. In addition, Rags Carter won four consecutive events. Buzzie Reutimann won a 150 lap race in 1971. Frankie Schneider won eleven races total at the track, the most of any driver.

In 1971, the large track was closed, and would remain closed until facility was purchased by Lindy Vicari in 1982. Vicari cleared eleven years of plant growth, refurbished the facilities, and shortened the bigger track to a one-mile (1.6 km) dirt oval. His idea was to host a series of high-paying special events for USAC’s Championship Dirt Cars and Modifieds. The races that he staged there drew big crowds, large competition, and much acclaim.

Maintaining the two dirt tracks turned out to be a larger financial burden than expected, and Vicari closed the two tracks. Brightbill’s $50,000 victory in a 125-mile Modified contest on October 9, 1983, was the last race that was run there under Vicari’s direction. The facility remained closed for three years.

Paved track

The facility and a large amount of property behind it was purchased by Roger Penske in 1986. Penske built a new track on the footprint of the old 1 mile dirt oval. At the same time, he sold the section of the property that held the old  mile track to the owners of Laneco, a former grocery store chain. Laneco built a new store on the site of the original track, which is now home to a Giant grocery store.

Penske's new track opened as Pennsylvania International Raceway in the fall of 1987. It was paved in asphalt, and had very modest banking. The elevation change during the lap was significant, as the backstretch ran steeply downhill for a drop of approximately 30 feet. The remainder of the track trekked mostly uphill. It was the first racing oval to feature a warm-up lane to enter and exit the pits, designed in part by driver Rick Mears. In 1993, the track was renamed Nazareth Speedway. In 1997, the facility underwent improvements, including a new retaining wall, catch fence, and new grandstands.

Track length of paved oval 
The paved track opened in 1987 and closely resembled the 1.125-mile dirt track layout. However, the length was shortened, and the turns were reconfigured to widen the radii. Though advertised as a 1-mile tri-oval, it actually measured less than one mile in length. The banking varied between 2.7° and 6.0°. The back straight was 1200 feet and main straight was 800 feet. Participants were known to exploit the inaccurate measurement for fuel strategy, knowing that they were running a shorter distance than officially advertised.

In 1997, for fairness and accuracy, the track was remeasured by the CART sanctioning body, and was advertised as 0.946 miles (1.52 km) in length. The race, which had been 200 laps, was increased to 225 laps for time value purposes. This length was used between 1997 and the last CART-race in 2001. The IRL used in 2002, 2003 and 2004 a length of 0.935 miles (1.504 km) for timing and scoring. However, NASCAR stayed to a length of exactly 1 mile till closing in 2004.

Closing

Although the Nazareth Speedway hosted rather successful Busch Series and CART events, new owner ISC closed the facility in late 2004. The races were replaced with events at Watkins Glen, another ISC-owned track. Access to the speedway was severely limited, and reopening as a professional motorsports facility was highly unlikely. As of May 2007, the grandstands, signage and all visible structures at the racetrack have been removed. The disassembled grandstands were transported and erected at Watkins Glen and Michigan International Speedway. The track remains fenced off and access to any part of the track or land surrounding it is restricted. Historical Google Earth imagery shows that by May 2008, large piles of earth were erected at various points around the track to prevent use of the racing surface.  Images as of September 2020 show those piles remain in place, though show signs of weathering.

Although the track closed in 2004, it is still featured in the EA Sports video games NASCAR SimRacing, NASCAR 2005: Chase for the Cup, NASCAR 06: Total Team Control, NASCAR 07, NASCAR 08 (PS2), and NASCAR 09 (PS2), which are based on the 2004, 2005, 2006, 2007, and 2008 NASCAR seasons, respectively. For the 2005-2008 games, the track was considered a fantasy track.

Redevelopment
In November 2015, Raceway Properties LLC purchased the property. As part of the offer, there is a non-compete clause that states that racing remains banned from returning to the property, mainly due to the proximity to Pocono Raceway. The property is currently zoned as general commercial property, with the most recent plans being to convert sections to residential zoning and build a warehouse for local business, C. F. Martin & Company.

Lap Records
The unofficial fastest outright track record on the original 1.125-mile Oval is 37.505 seconds, set by Billy Vukovich in a Watson-Offenhauser, during qualifying for the 1969 Nazareth 100. The fastest all-time track record on the reconfigured 0.946-mile Oval is 18.419 seconds, set by Patrick Carpentier in a Reynard 98I, during qualifying for the 1998 Bosch Spark Plug Grand Prix. The official race lap records at Nazareth Speedway are listed as:

Race winners

USAC Championship Car Series

Nazareth 100 (Dirt) 
1968 Al Unser
1969 Mario Andretti
1982 Keith Kauffman

CART/IRL Series

Bosch Spark Plug Grand Prix

NASCAR Busch Series

NASCAR Craftsman Truck Series

DeVilbiss Superfinish 200
1996 Jack Sprague (Race shortened to 152 laps/152 miles due to rain)

NAPA AutoCare 200
1997 Jack Sprague
1998 Ron Hornaday
1999 Greg Biffle

Chevy Silverado 200

2000 Dennis Setzer
2001 Greg Biffle

NASCAR Whelen Modified Tour
1991 Jan Leaty
1992 Jeff Fuller
1993 Tim Connolly
1994 Jeff Fuller
1995 Tony Hirschman
1996 Jan Leaty
1997 Mike Stefanik
1998 Mike Stefanik
1999 Eddie Flemke Jr.
2000 Mike Stefanik
2001 Mike Ewanitsko
2002 Nevin George
2003 Ted Christopher
2004 Todd Szegedy

IROC
1989 Danny Sullivan

In popular culture
Mark Knopfler wrote a song about a season of racing concluding at Nazareth Speedway titled "Speedway At Nazareth".  The song appears on Knopfler's second solo album, Sailing to Philadelphia.

See also
 Lake Erie Speedway, Erie County, south of North East, Pennsylvania
 Pocono Raceway

References

External links 
Nazareth Speedway Page on NASCAR.com 
Dirt track history
List of Champ Car races at Nazareth Speedway

Champ Car circuits
NASCAR tracks
International Race of Champions tracks
Buildings and structures in Northampton County, Pennsylvania
Motorsport venues in Pennsylvania
IndyCar Series tracks
1910 establishments in Pennsylvania
2004 disestablishments in Pennsylvania
Defunct motorsport venues in the United States
NASCAR races at Nazareth Speedway